Byron Rempel (born 1962) is a Quebec-based writer of Dutch Mennonite-descent born in Steinbach, Manitoba. He has written fiction and non-fiction, including his autobiography "Truth is Naked" in 2005, which was selected by The Globe and Mail among its 2006 Book of the Year selections. He was a finalist for the Quebec Writers' Federation Awards Mavis Gallant Prize twice, for "Truth is Naked" in 2006 and "No Limits" in 2008.

Bibliography
 True Detective (1997)
 Truth is Naked: All Others Pay Cash (2005)
 No Limits (2007)
 Sons and Mothers: Stories From Mennonite Men (2015)
 The Bodice Ripper (2017)

References

Canadian Mennonites
Canadian male novelists
Mennonite writers
Writers from Quebec
Living people
1962 births
Writers from Steinbach, Manitoba